Zeng Gong (1019–1083), courtesy name Zigu, was a Chinese essayist, historian, poet, politician, and writer of the Song Dynasty in China. He was one of the supporters of the New Classical Prose Movement and is regarded by later scholars as one of the Eight Great Prose Masters of the Tang and Song.

Zeng Gong was born in Nanfeng, Jianchang (modern Fuzhou, Jiangxi). He is said to have written Liulun 六論 ("Six arguments") when he was only twelve. After the work was praised by Ouyang Xiu, one of the intellectual leaders of the era, Zeng Gong became widely known among literary circles.

In 1037, at the age of eighteen, he moved to Yushan county (玉山縣, in modern Shangrao, Jiangxi) to accompany his father Zeng Yizhan, who had been appointed magistrate there. Whilst in Yushan, he travelled extensively in its hinterlands and wrote You Xinzhou Yushan Xiaoyan Ji. The work was divided into five sections. The first describes the geography of Yushan, followed by sections on the caves, rocks etc. Zeng's youthful descriptions show his vivid imagination and literary talent. In his twenties, Zeng Gong traveled throughout China, befriending the would be reformer Wang Anshi and later recommending him to Ouyang Xiu.

In 1057, Zeng Gong achieved the degree of jinshi and was appointed to a military post in the provinces. The next year, he was recalled to the capital and served within the department of history - collecting and drafting documents. From 1069, he was appointed successively as the head of Qizhou, Xiangzhou, Hongzhou, Fuzhou, Mingzhou and Bozhou.

In 1080, en route to a fresh appointment in Cangzhou, Zeng was granted an audience with Emperor Shenzong. The emperor was suitably impressed and allowed Zeng to stay at the capital to work on a history of the Five Dynasties period. Zeng Gong was promoted to become Aide to the Master of Writings in 1082. He died the following year in Jiangning. The new monarch Emperor Lizong granted him the posthumous appellation of "Wending".

Zeng Gong produced some four hundred poems in his lifetime and a number of essays. His style of prose writing is mostly discursive rather than argumentative. In terms of political philosophy, Zeng was a firm follower of Ouyang Xiu. For this reason his reputation as leader of one of the eight great schools of philosophy has largely been overshadowed by that of his mentor. Among Zeng Gong's collected works are fifty chapters of Yuanfeng Leigao, forty chapters of the Xu Yuanfeng Leigao and thirty chapters of the Longping Ji.

In May 2016 a letter by Zeng sold for ¥207 million at auction, setting a new record for a Chinese document sold at auction.

References 

1019 births
1083 deaths
11th-century antiquarians
11th-century Chinese historians
11th-century Chinese poets
Chinese travel writers
Historians from Jiangxi
Poets from Jiangxi
Politicians from Fuzhou, Jiangxi
Song dynasty historians
Song dynasty poets
Song dynasty politicians from Jiangxi